Jamie Howell (born 19 February 1977) is an English former professional footballer, who was most recently manager of National League South side Eastbourne Borough. He played in the football league for Torquay United. He represented England at Schoolboy and Youth level.

Career
Howell began his career as a trainee with Arsenal and was a member of the 1994 FA Youth Cup winning side. He turned professional in July 1995, but was released at the end of the following season, yet to make his Arsenal debut. In August 1996 Howell joined Portsmouth. He failed to appear in the Portsmouth first team, or for Notts County who he joined in March 1997.

In April 1997 he joined Torquay United on non-contract terms, making his debut on 12 April 1997 as a second-half substitute for Ian Hathaway in Torquay's 2–1 defeat at home to Barnet. He started the final two games of the season, defeats at home at Wigan Athletic and away to Doncaster Rovers, but was released at the end of the season.

He had a brief spell with Brighton & Hove Albion before joining Bognor Regis Town in October 1997, and went on to make over 400 appearances for them. He had a spell on loan with Burgess Hill Town in March 2007, before joining Burgess Hill as player-assistant manager in June 2007.

He was appointed as player-manager of Burgess Hill Town in December 2007. He remained in charge until March 2009 when he was sacked with the club just outside the relegation places.

Howell was appointed assistant to Darin Killpatrick at Bognor Regis Town on 1 June 2009, becoming joint manager with Killpartrick in February 2010 and manager in June 2010 with Killpartrick appointed as head coach.

Howell guided Bognor Bognor Regis Town to the National League South on 1 May 2017, beating Dulwich Hamlet 2–1.

Howell was appointed the new Eastbourne Borough manager on 3 May 2017. He was sacked by the club on 16 February 2019.

References

External links

1977 births
Living people
People from Rustington
English footballers
Association football midfielders
Arsenal F.C. players
Portsmouth F.C. players
Notts County F.C. players
Torquay United F.C. players
Brighton & Hove Albion F.C. players
Burgess Hill Town F.C. players
English Football League players
Bognor Regis Town F.C. players
English football managers
Bognor Regis Town F.C. managers
Eastbourne Borough F.C. managers
Isthmian League managers